Giuseppe Palizzi (Lanciano (Chieti), 1812 – Paris, 1888) was an Italian painter.

Biography
Giuseppe Palizzi moved to Naples in 1835 and enrolled at the Royal Institute of Fine Arts, where he came into contact with the painters of the Posillipo School, including Giacinto Gigante. He presented historical landscapes at the yearly shows, but strained relations with the academic world led him to leave Italy for Paris. It was in 1844 that he settled at Paris and not long after at Bourron-Marlotte (Seine&Marne) on the edge of the forest of Fontainebleau. This became the primary subject of his painting, which developed in the direction of painstaking realism through the influence of the Barbizon School, among other things. He kept in contact with his brother Filippo by letter and shared the results of his artistic explorations. He exhibited regularly at the Paris Salon and, after a short stay in Italy in 1854, returned to France, where he achieved great success with landscape paintings that often included the figures of humble labourers. He was made a member of the Legion of Honour in 1859 and received the Italian decoration of the Cross of the Knights of St Maurice and St Lazarus in 1862. He died in Paris in 1888.

References

Bibliography 
 Laura Casone, Giuseppe Palizzi , online catalogue Artgate by Fondazione Cariplo, 2010, CC BY-SA (source for the first revision of this article).
 Livio Zanone,  Giuseppe Palizzi et ses frères, Bull. Les Amis de Bourron-Marlotte n° 51, 2009.

Other projects

19th-century Italian painters
Italian male painters
Italian landscape painters
Accademia di Belle Arti di Napoli alumni
Painters from Naples
1812 births
1888 deaths
Burials at Père Lachaise Cemetery
19th-century Italian male artists